Don Johnson (June 11, 1922 – March 17, 1951) was an American cross-country skier. He competed in the men's 18 kilometre event at the 1948 Winter Olympics. He was killed in a plane crash during a snowstorm.

References

External links
 

1922 births
1951 deaths
American male cross-country skiers
American male Nordic combined skiers
Olympic cross-country skiers of the United States
Olympic Nordic combined skiers of the United States
Cross-country skiers at the 1948 Winter Olympics
Nordic combined skiers at the 1948 Winter Olympics
Place of birth missing
Victims of aviation accidents or incidents in 1951